Lake Nisqually is used to identify the freshwater lake formed in the Puget Sound trough, west of Tacoma. It is sometime confused with Early Lake Russell which covered the same area during a previous northward retreat of the glacier. The glacier returned southward, then on its final retreat northward, the waters filing this basin are referred to as Lake Nisqually.
Two deltas formed along the eastern margin of the lake from the outflow of Lake Tacoma in the Puyallup River valley. A rise in level to  reflects the closure of the Black Lake outlet while the two deltas were still growing.

The advance of the glacier sufficient to close the Black Lake outlet would turn the Nisqually River, and the drainage of the Steilacoom Plains across Chambers and Bush prairies.
During this advance the ice front would have been at a northeast-southwest course between Tacoma and Olympia.  The areas of Lake Puyallup and Lake Tacoma were not significantly affected. The Clover Creek and South Tacoma channels remained in use, and the gravel plains adjusted grades to the  level.
It appears that clearing of the Narrows occurred during this retreat, and that Lake Tacoma was thus lowered, and became a part of Lake Russell.

See also
Nisqually River
Frazer Glaciation
Vashon Glaciation

References

Nisqually
Nisqually
Pierce County, Washington
King County, Washington
Thurston County, Washington
Geography of Washington (state)
Nisqually